William Tremblay (born June 9, 1940) is an American poet, novelist, and Colorado State University Professor Emeritus.

Born in Southbridge, Massachusetts, Tremblay received a Bachelor of Arts in English Literature and a Master of Arts in American Literature from Clark University, and he received a Master of Fine Arts in Creative Writing (Poetry) from the University of Massachusetts Amherst' MFA Program for Poets & Writers. His awards include NEA, NEH, Fulbright, Pushcart Prize, Yaddo, and the John F. Stern Distinguished Professor Award from Colorado State University.

Books
 The June Rise, Utah State University Press, re-released from Fulcrum Publishing
 Crying in the Cheap Seats, Umass Press
 Duhamel: Ideas of Order in Little Canada, BOA Editions Ltd.
 The Anarchist Heart, New Rivers Press (1977)
 Home Front, Lynx House Press (1978)
 Rainstorm Over the Alphabet, Lynx House Press (2001)
 Shooting Script: Door of Fire, Eastern Washington University Press (2003)
 Walks Along the Ditch, Lynx House Press (2016)
 "The Luminous Race Track" Lynx House Press (2023)

External links
Colorado State University profile

Clark University alumni
American male poets
University of Massachusetts Amherst MFA Program for Poets & Writers alumni
Living people
1940 births
Colorado State University faculty